Pundri is a City and a municipal committee in Kaithal district of the Indian state of Haryana. Pundri along with Pundrak was named after the sage Pundarik, who is highly revered by all Hindus. Pundri is the seat of a Tehsil and also a Haryana Vidhan Sabha constituency currently represented by Randhir Singh Gollen.

Pundri is also known for its Firni, a sweet which is so popular that nearly 100 quintals of it are sold in the month of August around the festival of Teej.

Water Flour Mill few remaining in India now, but one of them is a mill which is 123 years old near pundri. This mill was built in 1890 and it is located at the ground floor. Pundri is also known as Fatehpur-Pundri for the village of Fatehpur adjoining it.

Geography 
It has an average elevation of 224 metres (734 feet).

Demographics 
As of the 2011 India census, Total population of Pundri is 33,484.[1] The sex ratio is 888 (F/M) and 12.02% of the population is under six years of age. The effective literacy rate is 67.8%; male literacy is 74.04% and female literacy is 60.75%. Punjabi, Haryanvi and Hindi are major languages.

Religious places 
Guru Bharamanand Aashram
 Pundrik tirth
 Gyarah Rudri Shiv Mandir
 Devi Mandir Fatehpur
 Gurudwara Shri Pundri Sahib

Transport 
Pundri is well connected with road network as it many cities Kaithal, Delhi, Chandigarh, Karnal, Kurukshetra.

Educational institutes

Government Schools 
 Govt. Senior Secondary School
 Govt. Girls Senior Secondary School
 Govt. Senior Secondary School, Fatehpur

Private Schools 
 DAV Public School
 BPR Public School
 RN Public School 
 Shweta Royal Public School
 Dhruv public school
 Anglo sanskrit senior secondary school

College 

 DAV College
 KMV College
 Maharaja Aggarsain College of Education
 Dr Bhim Rao Ambedkar Institute of Technology
 Govt. ITI

Gurukul 

 Pundri Gurukul
 Gurukul Takshshila 5 milestone Pundri karnal highway

Notable people 

 Randhir Singh Gollen is the current MLA. He is also chairman of Haryana state tourism.
 Dinesh Kaushik (politician)
 Ishwar Singh

References

See also 
 Kaithal

Cities and towns in Kaithal district
48 kos parikrama of Kurukshetra